Hurricane Iota was a devastating late-season Category 4 Atlantic hurricane which caused severe damage to areas of Central America already devastated by Hurricane Eta just less than two weeks prior. The 31st and final tropical cyclone, 30th named storm, 14th hurricane, and record-tying seventh major hurricane of the record-breaking 2020 Atlantic hurricane season, Iota originated as a tropical wave that moved into the Eastern Caribbean on November 10. Over the next few days, the wave began to become better organized and by November 13, it developed into a tropical depression north of Colombia. The depression strengthened into Tropical Storm Iota six hours later. After weakening slightly, Iota made landfall in northeastern Nicaragua as a mid-range Category 4 hurricane, becoming the strongest recorded hurricane to make landfall in Nicaragua in November. Iota then rapidly weakened as it moved inland, dissipating on November 18.

Iota's precursor disturbance generated flash flooding on several Caribbean islands. Tropical cyclone watches and warnings were first issued on November 14 in parts of Colombia, Nicaragua, and Honduras, with the latter two countries still recovering from Eta. Heavy rains associated with a tropical wave and Iota brought heavy rainfall to parts of Colombia, leading to flash flooding and mudslides. Extremely heavy rain fell on much of Nicaragua, widening flash flooding caused by the hurricane's high storm surge. Mudslides caused extensive damage and multiple deaths. At least 67 people were killed due to Iota, including at least 28 in Nicaragua and 16 in Honduras, among other countries. As many as 41 people were reported as missing. The preliminary estimate for the damage in Nicaragua was $564 million (2020 USD). Total damage estimates for the hurricane were set at $1.4 billion (2020 USD).

Relief efforts soon followed, which included placing tents, opening temporary hospitals, and delivering food and water to those in need. Numerous power outages were restored in the days that followed. Donations worth hundreds of millions of USD were given to affected countries. An estimated total of 5.2 million people were affected by the storm.

Meteorological history

On October 30, a tropical wave emerged from the west coast of Africa into the Atlantic. For the next several days, the tropical wave moved westward, while producing disorganized thunderstorms mainly east of the wave's axis. At 18:00 UTC on November 8, the National Hurricane Center (NHC) began to monitor the tropical wave in their tropical weather outlooks, as the system was forecasted to enter the area and potentially become a low-pressure area within a few days. The wave subsequently entered the Eastern Caribbean by 06:00 UTC on November 10 and moved westward into a more conducive environment for development. Late on November 11, the wave started to become better organized, and by 15:00 UTC on November 13, it had developed into Tropical Depression Thirty-One in the southern Caribbean, tying 2005 for the most tropical depressions recorded in one season. Six hours later, the system strengthened into Tropical Storm Iota. After struggling somewhat due to wind shear and dry air, Iota began to rapidly intensify over warm waters late on November 14, as convection started to wrap around the storm's center. At 06:00 UTC on November 15, Iota reached hurricane status, before strengthening to Category 2 status at 00:00 UTC on November 16.

By 06:00 UTC on November 16, hurricane hunters discovered that Iota had become a high-end Category 3 major hurricane, marking the first time that two major hurricanes were recorded in November. They also found intense lightning in Iota's southwest eyewall along with hail, which is extremely rare for a hurricane due to the warm temperatures that are present in those storms. Just 40 minutes later, at 06:40 UTC, Iota reached Category 4 intensity. However, in the yearly post-season analysis, Iota was downgraded to a Category 4 hurricane, due to some questionable SFMR readings produced by the reconnaissance flight, as well as a recalibration of the SFMR values. After peaking in intensity, Iota weakened somewhat as it crossed over the cold wake created by Hurricane Eta two weeks prior. This also made Iota the strongest hurricane in recorded history to make landfall in Nicaragua within November.

Iota then rapidly weakened as it moved over the mountainous terrain of Central America, falling below Category 3 major hurricane status at 09:00 UTC on November 17, and below Category 1 hurricane status at 18:00 UTC. The inner core of the weakening system was disrupted as it moved through Honduras, and Iota weakened to a tropical depression at 09:00 UTC on November 18, as it entered El Salvador. Six hours after this downgrade, Iota's low-level circulation center dissipated, and the NHC issued their final advisory on Iota.

Preparations

Tropical storm warnings were first issued for the Colombian islands of San Andrés and Providencia around midday on November 14. Three hours later, a hurricane watch was issued for Providencia, as well as along the coast of Northern Nicaragua and Eastern Honduras, with a tropical storm watch also issued for Central Honduras. All of the watches were eventually upgraded to warnings, with an additional hurricane watch for San Andrés as well as a tropical storm warning for south central Nicaragua. The rest of the coastline of Honduras, as well as the Bay Islands, were later put under tropical storm warnings on November 16.

Oxfam had to temporarily suspend operations across Nicaragua, Honduras, Guatemala, and El Salvador related to Hurricane Eta to protect relief works.

Nicaragua
With Nicaragua still reeling from Hurricane Eta two weeks prior, many areas remained flooded. Towns around Puerto Cabezas in particular were devastated by Eta and debris remained strewn across the area. The International Federation of Red Cross and Red Crescent Societies emphasized the risk of widespread flooding and landslides as soils were completely saturated. The Government of Nicaragua opened 600 shelters and 63,000 people evacuated nationwide. Some residents feared starvation while residing in shelters as Eta largely destroyed the region's crops. The government of Taiwan donated 800 tons of rice to the areas expected to be impacted by the storm.

Honduras
Approximately 80,000 people were evacuated from flood-prone areas. An estimated 100,000 people remained isolated across Honduras in the aftermath of Hurricane Eta as Iota made landfall.

El Salvador
The Government of El Salvador opened 1,000 shelters with a capacity for 30,000 people. By November 17, 700 people had relocated from their homes.

Impact

Total damage from the storm is estimated at US$1.4 billion.

Venezuela
The precursor tropical wave to Iota produced heavy rain across Venezuela's Falcón state, primarily in the Paraguaná Peninsula. In the Silva municipality, flooding affected 288 homes. Damage to homes was reported in El Cayude and El Tranquero. The community of Santa Ana lost electrical service. Civil Protection officials advised residents of possible flooding along the Matícora reservoir in Mauroa, the Barrancas river, and the Quebrada de Uca river. Some flooding occurred in the state of Miranda.

Colombia

Mainland 

Heavy rains associated with a tropical wave and Iota caused extensive damage in Colombia. The worst damage took place in the Mohán sector of Dabeiba where landslides killed three people, injured 20, and left eight others missing. Eight people were rescued from the rubble. The landslides destroyed 67 homes and damaged 104 others as well as three schools. A total of 497 people were affected in the community. Approximately 100 vehicles were trapped by rockfalls along a road between Dabeiba and Urabá. Flooding affected 10 municipalities within the Chocó Department; the town of Lloró was isolated after the only bridge to the community collapsed. A landslide in Carmen de Atrato killed one person when his home was buried. Across Chocó, an estimated 28,000 people were affected. A van with two occupants disappeared when a landslide dragged the vehicle into the Atrato River. Emergencies were declared for 29 municipalities in the Santander Department where multiple rivers topped their banks. Several families were evacuated from Cimitarra due to rising water along the Carare River. A bridge collapse along the Chicamocha River isolated approximately 1,000 people in Carcasí and Enciso. More than 1,000 homes were damaged in the Atlántico Department: 693 in Malambo, 200 in Candelaria, and 150 in Carreto.

An estimated 70 percent of Cartagena saw flooding due to the direct effects of Iota, affecting an estimated 155,000 people. Numerous homes were damaged or destroyed by floods and landslides. Two people died in the San Pedro neighborhood when the motorcycle they were riding was swept into a canal. City officials converted the Coliseo de Combate into a shelter capable of accommodating 200 people.

Providencia and San Andrés 
On November 15–16, Iota passed close to the outlying Archipelago of San Andrés, Providencia and Santa Catalina as a high-end Category 4 hurricane. Communication was lost with the island on November 16, lasting for over 20 hours. An estimated 98–99 percent of structures on the island were damaged or destroyed, including buildings constructed in the 15th century. Every home on the island suffered damage, with 80 percent being destroyed. One person was killed and six were injured on the island. Two shelters were known to have lost their roof before communication was lost. The situation on the island was difficult to ascertain as of November 17, though the island's hospital was assumed destroyed or rendered inoperable. Although debris covered runways at El Embrujo Airport, initially preventing aircraft from arriving or leaving, by November 17 it was operational enough to allow President Duque to visit and assess the damage of the island.

On San Andrés, torrential rains and large swells caused extensive flooding. Powerful winds uprooted numerous trees, some of which fell on homes, and several homes lost their roof. Communications with San Andrés were temporarily lost during the storm and approximately 60 percent of the island lost power. One person was killed on the island.

Central America

Nicaragua
Nearly 44,000 homes suffered total or partial damage in Nicaragua, said Nicaraguan Finance Minister Ivan Acosta, estimating the storms have cost the country $743 million in losses, according to the government media site El 19.

Damage reports, however, were extremely limited due to damage the area sustained previously from Hurricane Eta. These reports were also limited due to most communications to Puerto Cabezas being knocked out during the storm. An amateur radio from Club de Radio-Experimentadores de Nicaragua (CREN) reported winds of  winds and damaged roofs, although it was unclear whether these were sustained winds or wind gusts. The roof was torn off of a makeshift hospital that was serving as a replacement to an older hospital, requiring an evacuation of the patients there.

A total of 160,233 homes lost power in Nicaragua and 47,638 families lost water service. The Instituto Nicaragüense de Telecomunicaciones y Correos|es reported loss of telephone service to 35 communities. Torrential rains on already saturated soils led to extensive flooding and landslides. A storm surge of at least  occurred near the town of Haulover and further north near the community of Wawa Bar. At least 28 people died in relation to the hurricane while 29 others are missing. Two children were swept away by a river in Santa Teresa, Carazo, while three other members of their family went missing; a sixth family member was rescued. A landslide killed two people in Wiwilí de Jinotega and another person died in Quilalí. In Wiwilí, fears arose over the safety of residents who evacuated into the mountains to escape flooding as numerous landslides occurred in the region. On November 17, at least 30 people were buried in a landslide in Macizo de Penas Blancas, and a boy was found buried. The next day, four more bodies were recovered, including one of a baby. On November 23 a passenger truck plunged off a road in a mountainous area that had been devastated by Iota, an accident which caused the deaths of 17 people and 25 injuries. A preliminary damage estimate places the damages at 12.3 billion córdobas (US$352.5 million).

Honduras

Together, Hurricanes Eta and Iota killed around 100 Hondurans, and local analysts estimated the damage would cost the country more than 10 billion dollars (L244.1 billion).

Iota produced heavy rainfall over portions of Honduras, causing a river to overflow in Tocoa. Mudslides and uprooted trees were also reported in portions of the country. At least 16 people have died and one other is missing as a result of impacts from Iota in Honduras. Landslides were the primary cause of fatalities; one in San Manuel Colohete killed eight people and another in Los Trapiches killed five people. Teonela Paisano Wood, the mayor of Brus Laguna, stated concerns that continued rainfall pose a large threat to the town. Various concrete and wooden houses were reduced to rubble. As of the morning of November 18, COPECO reported 366,123 people were directly affected by the hurricane. 80% of Copán Ruinas' roads were rendered impassible due to mudslides and flash flooding. The Ramón Villeda Morales International Airport is expected to be remained closed until mid-December. The passenger terminal experienced severe damages, and estimated repair times are more than a month.

Elsewhere
Officials in Panama said one person was killed in Nole Duima in the Ngäbe-Buglé Comarca. Another person was missing in Soloy, also in the region. In Mexico, the states of Chiapas, Tabasco, and Veracruz all experienced effects from Iota's rainfall. Cumulative total across the three states were nearly 297,000 affected people, as well as almost 59,000 homes being damaged. Blocked roads cut off access to 135 communities.

Aftermath
Spreading of disease, ranging from colds and skin rashes to gastrointestinal problems became much more common. Other infection rates of illnesses, such as Dengue fever and COVID-19 are increasing as well. Some were refusing to be tested for COVID, due to fears of being refused shelter due to infection. People in need of medications have not been able to get them.

Colombia
Following restoration of communication with Providencia on November 16, President Duque pledged immediate aid to the island. A state of emergency was declared for a year. Rough seas on November 17 prevented the Colombian Navy from reaching the island, though Duque was able to fly by helicopter for an aerial survey. Two field hospitals and 4,000 tents were to be set up on the island. Emphasis was placed on evacuating critical injuries to the mainland before establishing the field hospitals. By November 19, 112 people were airlifted from the island. The Colombian military deployed engineers and 15 tons of food. Duque stated that a plan for the complete reconstruction of Providencia's infrastructure was to be drawn up within 100 days and that all of the destroyed housing would be rebuilt by 2022. Duque pledged 150 billion pesos (US$41 million) for infrastructure repair. The relative lack of casualties in Providencia is attributed to residents adhering to warnings and seeking refuge in sturdy structures or interior bathrooms. Opposition to Duque criticized him for not evacuating Providencia ahead of the storm. On November 18, the Government of Colombia pledged 500 billion pesos (US$136 million) for recovery efforts in Bolívar and Cartagena.

Nicaragua
Nicaragua's power company, Enatrel, dispatched more than 100 crews to the Caribbean Coast to restore electricity. By November 17, nearly half of the outages were restored.

Operation USA began preparations for relief efforts on November 17. Nicaragua's army had sent 100 rescuers to a site where a landslide caused damage. Downed trees blocking the road hampered the effort.  About 1,000 food kits will be delivered, as well as recreational activities for sheltered children. The food kits will be available until the government is able to provide adequate food support. 1,000 hygiene kits, which include laundry soap, hand and dish soap, bleach, and toilet paper will be given. Families will also receive purified water, face masks, blankets, buckets, plastic sheets, eggs and beef (the last two for preferred protein sources).

Honduras

As of November 25, 2.5 million people had limited or no access to health services due to impacts. Officials have reported that more than 4 million people have been affected by Eta and Iota. Project HOPE has given shipments of Personal protective equipment, 50,000 masks, as well as items for the WASH project. 185,000 people have been displaced. Additionally, ten health facilities reported a complete loss of cold chain equipment, which hampered preparations made for distribution of COVID-19 vaccines.

Retirement
Due to the damage and loss of life in Honduras, Nicaragua, Providencia, and San Andres, the letter Iota was retired on March 17, 2021, at the joint 42nd and 43rd sessions of the RA IV hurricane committee, and will never be used again for an Atlantic hurricane. The WMO also announced at the meeting that the naming system based on the Greek alphabet would be discontinued and replaced with an auxiliary list consisting of 21 given names if the regular naming list is exhausted.

See also

Tropical cyclones in 2020
List of Category 4 Atlantic hurricanes
List of costliest Atlantic hurricanes
Hurricane Fifi–Orlene (1974) – A deadly Category 2 crossover hurricane that devastated similar areas
Hurricane Joan–Miriam (1988) – A destructive Category 4 crossover hurricane that took a similar path
Hurricane Opal (1995) – the most intense Category 4 Hurricane ever in the Atlantic Ocean.
Hurricane Cesar–Douglas (1996) – A deadly Category 1 crossover hurricane that took a similar path
Hurricane Mitch (1998) – A Category 5 hurricane that devastated similar areas
Hurricane Wilma (2005) – A Category 5 hurricane that also rapidly intensified in a similar region
Hurricane Felix (2007) – A Category 5 hurricane that took a similar track and also rapidly intensified prior to landfall
Hurricane Matthew (2016) – A Category 5 hurricane that formed in similar areas.
Hurricane Otto (2016) – A destructive Category 3 crossover hurricane that took a similar path on similar dates in 2016.
Hurricane Bonnie (2022) - A Category 3 hurricane that later crossed over to the Pacific that took a similar path just two years later in 2022.

References

External links

 The National Hurricane Center's Advisory Archive on Hurricane Iota
 National Hurricane Center Website
 Hurricane Iota - Nov 2020 report from ReliefWeb

Tropical cyclones in 2020
2020 Atlantic hurricane season
Category 4 Atlantic hurricanes
November 2020 events in North America
November 2020 events in South America
2020 in Colombia
2020 in Nicaragua
2020 in Honduras
2020 in Costa Rica
2020 in Panama
2020 in El Salvador
2020 in Guatemala
Hurricanes in Colombia
Hurricanes in Nicaragua
Hurricanes in Honduras
Hurricanes in Costa Rica
Hurricanes in Panama
Hurricanes in El Salvador
Hurricanes in Guatemala
Retired Atlantic hurricanes